The FIFA Beach Soccer World Cup – Europe qualifier is a beach soccer championship that takes place to determine the nations who will represent Europe at the upcoming edition of the FIFA Beach Soccer World Cup. It is contested between the senior men's national teams of the members of UEFA.

In 2006, FIFA made qualification to the World Cup mandatory (previously, nations were simply invited). Originally, the Euro Beach Soccer League (EBSL) doubled as Europe's qualification tournament; in 2008, this separate championship was created as the European qualification route. FIFA currently allocate Europe five berths at the World Cup and hence the top five teams qualify to the World Cup finals.[see notes] Coinciding with the annual staging of the World Cup, the competition took place yearly until 2010; the World Cup then became biennial, and as its supplementary qualification event, the championship followed suit.

Beach Soccer Worldwide (BSWW) have organised the event since its inception. Europe's governing body for football, UEFA, only began involvement in 2019 – sending delegates and financial support. Unlike the World Cup qualifiers for UEFA in football, it is a knockout tournament with a champion crowned. Its large scale and competitiveness are often noted, making it viewed as a major title to win.

Spain are the most successful team with four titles. However, Portugal and Russia have secured qualification to the World Cup on the most occasions (six).

Founding
In 2006, FIFA declared that for teams to enter to the World Cup, they now must qualify (previously, most teams entered by invitation). Qualification tournaments were subsequently established in all continental zones, except for Europe. For European teams, a qualification process had already been implemented for the previous handful of World Cups – the top placed teams of the most recent season of the Euro Beach Soccer League (EBSL) earned qualification to the upcoming edition of the World Cup. Thus, the EBSL continued to double as the qualifying route for European teams.

In 2008, FIFA proclaimed that the next editions of the World Cup would take place in different countries. Until that point, all World Cups had been held in Brazil during summertime of the Southern Hemisphere, months after the conclusion of that year's EBSL season. That year, the World Cup was held in Marseille, France, and during a different time of the year – in July. The usual European qualification route, the EBSL, was not due to conclude until weeks after the World Cup had taken place. This separate knockout tournament, dedicated purely to determining the teams qualifying to the World Cup, was organised instead; free to be placed anywhere in the calendar, it took place in the May. It "made history", becoming the biggest international beach soccer event ever held at the time with 24 participants. It has since returned in all future years as Europe's qualification tournament. The organisers, Beach Soccer Worldwide (BSWW), decided not to revert to using the EBSL.

Results
For all tournaments, the top four teams qualified for the FIFA Beach Soccer World Cup (except for 2009 and 2019, when the top five teams qualified).

Performance

Successful nations

Awards

All-time top goalscorers
As of 2021

The following table shows the all-time top 25 goalscorers.

Source: Match reports. (However, note that some match reports are incomplete resulting in nine undocumented goalscorers (Italy 4, Azerbaijan 4, Romania 1) which, if they were to be known, may affect the table below.).

All-time table
As of 2021

Key:
Appearances App / Won in normal time W = 3 points / Won in extra-time W+ = 2 points / Won on penalty shoot-out WP = 1 point / Lost L = 0 points / Points per game PPG

Appearances & performance timeline 
The following is a performance timeline of the teams who have appeared in the UEFA qualifiers and how many appearances they each have made.
Legend

 – Champions
 – Runners-up
 – Third place
 – Fourth place
 – Fifth place (if qualified to World Cup)
5th...16th – Fifth to sixteenth place
R3 – Round 3 (Quarter-finals or 2nd group stage)
R2 – Round 2 (round of 16)
R1 – Round 1 (group stage)

•• – Entered but withdrew
× – Did not enter
 – Did not enter (because already qualified to World Cup as hosts)
 – Hosts
Apps – No. of appearances

Timeline

Performance of qualifiers at the World Cup

The following is a performance timeline of the UEFA teams who have gone on to appear in the World Cup, having qualified from the above events.

Legend

 – Champions
 – Runners-up
 – Third place
 – Fourth place
 – Hosts (qualify automatically)

QF – Quarter-finals
R1 – Round 1 (group stage)
•• – Qualified but withdrew
q – Qualified for upcoming tournament
Total – Total times qualified for World Cup

Timeline

Notes
The fifth placed team does not always qualify to the World Cup:

RFU:

References

External links
Beach Soccer Worldwide, official website

 
UEFA
Beach Soccer World Cup qualification (UEFA)
Recurring sporting events established in 2008
2008 establishments in Europe